The Bell AH-1Z Viper is a twin-engine attack helicopter, based on the AH-1W SuperCobra, designed and produced by the American aerospace manufacturer Bell Helicopter. Being one of the latest members of the prolific Bell Huey family, it is also called "Zulu Cobra", based on the military phonetic alphabet pronunciation of its variant letter.

The AH-1Z was developed during the 1990s and 2000s as a part of the H-1 upgrade program on behalf of the United States Marine Corps (USMC). It is essentially a modernisation of the service's existing AH-1Ws, and was originally intended to be a rebuild program before subsequent orders were made for new-build helicopters instead. The AH-1Z and Bell UH-1Y Venom utility helicopter share a common tailboom, engines, rotor system, drivetrain, avionics architecture, software, controls and displays for over 84% identical components. Furthermore, it features a four-blade, bearingless, composite main rotor system, uprated transmission, and a new target sighting system amongst other improvements. On 8 December 2000, the AH-1Z conducted its maiden flight; low-rate initial production was launched in October 2003.

On 30 September 2010, the USMC declared that the AH-1Z had attained combat readiness; it fully replaced the preceding AH-1W Super Cobra during October 2020. The type forms a key element of the Aviation Combat Element (ACE) taskforce which support all phases of USMC expeditionary operations. Since its introduction, the USMC has pursued various upgrades, such as installing Link 16 datalink and outfitting it with the AGM-179A Joint Air-to-Ground Missile (JAGM). Additionally, numerous export customers have been sought for the AH-1Z, it has regularly competed with the Boeing AH-64 Apache for orders. The first export customer was the Royal Bahraini Air Force, the Czech Air Force has also ordered the type. At one point, Pakistan was set to operate its own AH-1Zs, but deliveries were blocked due to political factors.

Development

Background
Aspects of the AH-1Z can be traced back to the experimental Bell 249 of 1979, which was essentially an upgraded AH-1S, having been equipped with the four-blade main rotor system from the Bell 412 utility helicopter. The Bell 249 was used as a demonstrator for Bell's Cobra II concept, and made an appearance at the Farnborough Airshow in 1980. As promoted by Bell, the Cobra II was to be equipped with various new and redesigned combat systems, which included the AGM-114 Hellfire air-to-ground missile, a new targeting system, and was also to be powered by improved engines as well.

The further-developed Cobra 2000 proposal included the General Electric T700 engine and a four-blade rotor. While Bell's for the proposal did generate some interest within the US Marine Corps, funding was not forthcoming to pursue its development at that time. During 1993, Bell opted to enter an AH-1W-based variant for the UK's new attack helicopter program. This derivative, which was named the CobraVenom, featured a modern digital cockpit and could carry wire-guided missiles, Hellfire or Brimstone missiles. The CobraVenom design was further refined two years later, notably by the adoption of a four-blade rotor system. However, later that same year, a rival bid for the AH-64D Apache Longbow was selected to fulfil the program instead.

H-1 upgrade program

In 1996, the USMC launched the H-1 upgrade program by signing a contract with Bell Helicopter for upgrading 180 AH-1Ws into AH-1Zs and upgrading 100 UH-1Ns into UH-1Ys.  The H-1 program created completely modernized attack and utility helicopters with considerable design commonality to reduce operating costs. The AH-1Z and UH-1Y share a common tailboom, engines, rotor system, drivetrain, avionics architecture, software, controls and displays for over 84% identical components.

Bell participated in a joint government test team during the engineering manufacturing and development phase of the H-1 program. Research and development progressed slowly from 1996 to 2003.  The existing two-blade semi-rigid, teetering rotor system was replaced with a four-blade, hingeless, bearingless rotor system. The four-blade configuration provides improvements in flight characteristics including increased flight envelope, maximum speed, vertical rate of climb, payload and reduced rotor vibration level.

The AH-1Z first flew on 8 December 2000.  Bell delivered three prototype aircraft to the United States Navy's Naval Air Systems Command at Naval Air Station Patuxent River in July 2002, for the flight test phase of the program. Low-rate initial production began in October 2003, with deliveries running through 2018.  In late 2006, a contract was awarded to Meggitt Defense Systems to develop a new linkless 20 mm ammunition handling system to improve on the gun feed reliability of the existing linked feed system.

In February 2008, the U.S. Navy adjusted the contract so the last 40 AH-1Zs were built as new airframes instead of the previously planned rebuild of AH-1Ws. In September 2008, the Navy requested an additional 46 airframes for the Marine Corps, bringing the total number ordered to 226. During 2010, the Marine Corps ordered 189 AH-1Zs, with 58 of them being new airframes, with deliveries to continue until 2022. On 10 December 2010, the Department of the Navy approved the AH-1Z for full-rate production.

In November 2022, Bell delivered the 189th AH-1Z to the U.S. Marine Corps, completing the program of record for the Viper. Combined with the 160 UH-1Y airframes which completed delivery in 2018, it marked the final deliveries of the H-1 series rotorcraft for the U.S. military since deliveries began in 1959.

Design

The Bell AH-1Z Viper is an attack helicopter derived from the earlier Bell AH-1 SuperCobra. When contrasted against its predecessor, it incorporates various improvements and advances, including new rotor technology, upgraded military avionics, updated weapons systems, and electro-optical sensors in an integrated weapons platform. Amongst other advantages provided by these changes, it has improved survivability and can locate targets at longer ranges and also attack them using precision weapons. The airframe was extensively redesigned to maximise crashworthiness; measures include energy-absorbing landing gear, fuel vapor inerting systems, self-sealing fuel tanks, energy-attenuating crashworthy seating, and a mass retention design approach applied to many major components. Active systems include countermeasure dispensers, radar warning, incoming/on-way missile warning, on-fuselage laser spot warning systems, and the Hover Infrared Suppression System (HIRSS) to protect the engine exhausts.

The AH-1Z is equipped with a bearingless and hingeless rotor system; this has 75% fewer parts than that of four-bladed articulated systems. The rotor blades are composed of composites, which give them increased ballistic survivability; the rotor is equipped with a semi-automatic folding system, enabling the AH-1Z to be stored more efficiently aboard amphibious assault ships and other means of transportation. Efforts were made to maximise its maintainability and to minimise maintenance requirements; in comparison to the SuperCobra, numerous maintenance tasks have been eliminated, interactive electronic technical manuals have been produced, less spares storage is required, and accessibility has also been improved. Furthermore, various fault detection sensors are present to facilitate condition-based maintenance.

The AH-1Z is equipped with a pair of redesigned stub wings, these being substantially longer than those of the preceding SuperCobra. Each one has an additional wingtip station for a missile such as the AIM-9 Sidewinder. Each stub wing has two other stations for 2.75-inch (70 mm) Hydra 70 rocket pods, or AGM-114 Hellfire quad missile launchers. The AN/APG-78 Longbow fire control radar can also be mounted on a wingtip station. Similarly, other mission equipment can be fitted to these stations, including 77 and 100 gallon external auxiliary fuel tanks, LUU-2A/B nighttime illumination flares, and numerous types of practice munitions. Underneath the nose of the AH-1Z is an A/A49E-7 turret fitted with a 20 mm (0.787 in) M197 three-barreled rotary cannon; this weapon has a higher muzzle velocity and flatter trajectory than predecessors; it is also compatible with M50-series air-to-air rounds.

The cockpit of the AH-1Z has been designed so that both crewmembers have virtually identical controls; it can be readily flown from either the front or rear positions. These positions incorporate a Hands on Collective and Stick (HOCAS) side-stick architecture, which enables many functions to be carried out by the pilot without moving their hands from the flight controls. Both of the two crew stations are provisioned with a pair of 8×6-inch multifunction liquid crystal displays (LCD) and a single 4.2×4.2-inch dual function LCD. The AH-1Z has an integrated avionics system developed by Northrop Grumman; this system includes two mission computers and an automatic flight control system. The communications suite combines a U.S. Navy RT-1824 integrated radio, UHF/VHF, COMSEC and modem into a single unit. The navigation suite includes an embedded GPS inertial navigation system, a digital map system and Meggitt's low-airspeed air data subsystem, which allows weapons delivery when hovering.

Crew members are equipped with the Thales "Top Owl" helmet-mounted sight and display system. This display provides a 24-hour day/night capability and a binocular display with a 40° field of view; its visor projection provides forward-looking infrared (FLIR) or video imagery. Furthermore, it has been designed from the onset to accommodate in-service upgrades. The Lockheed Martin target sight system (TSS) incorporates a third-generation FLIR sensor which provides target sighting and identification in day, night, or adverse weather conditions. It is a passive sensor, unlike radar, thus is untrackable. The TSS has various view modes and can track with FLIR or by TV. The same system is also used on the KC-130J Harvest HAWK.

Operational history

United States

During May 2005, it was announced that the AH-1Z had completed its first round of sea-based flight trials. On 15 October 2005, the USMC, through the Naval Air Systems Command, accepted delivery of the first AH-1Z production standard helicopter. Both the AH-1Z and UH-1Y completed their developmental testing during early 2006. During the first quarter of 2006, initial examples of the type were transferred to the Operational Test Unit at the NAS Patuxent River to undergo operational evaluation (OPEVAL) testing. In February 2008, both the AH-1Z and UH-1Y began the second and final portion of OPEVAL testing. On 30 September 2010, the USMC declared that the AH-1Z had attained combat readiness.

Since the type's introduction, numerous upgrades have been investigated and integrated. During March 2022, it was announced that the AGM-179A Joint Air-to-Ground Missile (JAGM) has achieved initial operational capability upon the AH-1Z; this munition will replace both the Hellfire and Maverick missiles. As of early 2022, work to install kits to facilitate a Link 16 datalink upon both the AH-1Z and UH-1Y was underway.

During October 2020, the USMC announced the withdrawal of the last of its AH-1W Super Cobras; the type has been entirely replaced by AH-1Z Vipers. In USMC service, the AH-1Z forms a key element of the Aviation Combat Element (ACE), a task-orientated force of supporting the USMC throughout all phases of its expeditionary operations; key tasks in this capacity include offensive air support, anti-air warfare, assault support, and aerial reconnaissance. During the early 2020s, there were debates over cutting as much as one-third of the USMC's attack helicopter fleet in order to reallocate budget to other capabilities. In May 2021, even as deliveries continued, several USMC AH-1Zs went into long-term storage at the 309th Aerospace Maintenance and Regeneration Group (AMARG) in Arizona as part of a wider restructuring effort.

Bahrain

On 27 April 2018, the U.S. Defense Security Cooperation Agency announced it had received U.S. State Department approval and notified Congress of a possible sale to Bahrain of 12 AH-1Zs, 26 T-700 GE 401C engines, and armaments for an estimated cost of US$911.4 million. In November 2018, Bahrain confirmed the order for 12 AH-1Zs, and the first six were delivered in mid-2022.

Production of AH-1Zs for Bahrain were completed on December 2022 and final deliveries will be made in 2023.

Czech Republic

In 2016, Bell was also interested in selling the AH-1Z to the Czech Republic, which sought to retire its Soviet-era Mil Mi-24 gunships. In December 2019, the Czech Republic finalized the sale with the U.S. of four AH-1Zs for the Czech Air Force. In March 2022, Czech Defense Minister Jana Černochová announced plans to buy further helicopters, attributing this decision to the recent Russian invasion of Ukraine.

Other foreign interest
During the early 2010s, the AH-1Z was being offered to South Korea, competing against the AH-64 Apache and the TAI/AgustaWestland T129 ATAK attack helicopters. During April 2013, South Korea announced the selection of the rival AH-64E bid.

In April 2015, the U.S. State Department approved a possible Foreign Military Sales (FMS) to Pakistan for 15 AH-1Z Vipers with Hellfire missiles, associated equipment and support worth up to $952 million. In early 2016 Pakistan was reportedly set to receive nine AH-1Zs by September 2018. However, Pakistan's order was placed on hold on account of political tensions between the U.S. and Pakistan. The order for 12 aircraft has not been cancelled; by May 2019, nine have been built but are stored at the 309th AMARG base, awaiting a resolution to the friction between the two countries.

During 2016, it was reported that the Royal Moroccan Air Force was interested in procuring a number of AH-1Zs.

In November 2016, Bell Helicopter signed a memorandum of understanding with Romanian airspace company IAR – Ghimbav Brasov Group for potential collaboration on the AH-1Z.  In August 2017, Romania also signed a letter of intent with Bell Helicopter to establish a joint venture with Romanian state-owned ROMARM for the potential procurement of a number of AH-1Zs.

In 2017, Bell promoted both the AH-1Z and the UH-1Y Venom to the Australian Army as a potential replacement for their existing fleet of Eurocopter Tiger attack helicopters. In January 2021, the Australian Government announced that it would purchase the AH-64E Apache to replace its Tigers.

In July 2017, Bell Helicopter and Polish Armaments Group signed a letter of intent planning on cooperating on the UH-1Y and AH-1Z helicopters, forming a potential bid for the Polish Kruk attack helicopter acquisition program, part of a wider modernization effort. In March 2022, in light of Russia's invasion  of Ukraine, Poland has reportedly delayed a decision on new attack helicopters until after the completion of a sweeping security review.

In October 2017, Thailand's minister of Defence Prawit Wongsuwan stated that Thailand is looking onto replacing its fleet of aging AH-1F Cobra attack helicopters and will launch a procurement committee to look into the matter. Royal Thai Army officials have said that they are interested in the AH-1Z, as well as the Agusta A129 Mangusta, Mil Mi-28, CAIC Z-10, Bell AH-1 SuperCobra and Boeing AH-64 Apache.

On 30 April 2020, the U.S. Defense Security Cooperation Agency announced it had received U.S. State Department approval and notified Congress of a possible sale to the Philippines of either six AH-1Z attack helicopters and related equipment for an estimated cost of $450 million or six AH-64E Apache attack helicopters and related equipment for an estimated cost of $1.5 billion.

Nigeria has sought to procure AH-1Zs for some time. Sales were initially blocked by Congress over human rights concerns; however, during April 2022, it was announced that the U.S. State Department had given its approval for the sale of the type along with support apparatus via a nearly $1 billion contract.

Operators

 Royal Bahraini Air Force (6 delivered out of 12 on order)

 Czech Air Force (4 on order) Additional 6 to be gifted at no cost via the Excess Defense Articles programme.

 United States Marine Corps (189 delivered)

Specifications (AH-1Z)

See also

References

External links

 AH-1Z page on Bell flight web site
 AH-1Z Viper UH-1Y Venom Helicopters page on US Navy site
 AH-1Z page on GlobalSecurity.org
 Bell AH-1Z Super Cobra (Bell 449) on helis.com

H-001Z, A
United States military helicopters
H-01 Cobra
2000s United States helicopters
Twin-turbine helicopters
Aircraft first flown in 2000
Attack helicopters